Buslingthorpe is a hamlet and civil parish in the West Lindsey district of Lincolnshire, England.

A large manor house was constructed in approximately 2010 on the land of 2 demolished houses.

A writer in Notes and queries in 1932 noted that the Buslingthorpe (shared with Buslingthorpe, Leeds and Buckfastleigh, Devon) contains 13 different letters, exactly half the alphabet, none repeated and with no hyphenation, and wondered whether that was unique. In 2007 David Crystal noted that Bricklehampton surpasses this with 14 unique letters.

Notable people
 Sir Roger Scruton (1944-2020), English philosopher and writer

References

Villages in Lincolnshire
Civil parishes in Lincolnshire
West Lindsey District